The Egyptians Act 1530 (22 Henry VIII, c. 10) was an Act passed by the Parliament of England in 1531 to expel the "outlandish people calling themselves Egyptians", meaning Roma. It was repealed by the Repeal of Obsolete Statutes Act 1856.

Content
The Act accused Roma of using "crafty and subtle devices" to deceive people, notably by claiming to tell fortunes whilst also allegedly frequently committing felonies such as robbery. The statute forbade any more Roma from entering the realm and gave those already in England sixteen days' notice to depart from the realm. Goods which Roma had stolen were to be restored to their owners. Roma who violated the statute were to have their properties confiscated and divided between the Sovereign and the Justice of the Peace or another arresting officer.

Egyptians Act 1554

The 1530 act was not successful in its aim of expelling all Roma, for Mary I passed the Egyptians Act 1554 (1 & 2 Philip & Mary, c. 4), which complained that "Egyptians" were plying their "devilish and naughty practices and devices".  However, the newer act allowed some Roma to escape prosecution so long as they abandoned their nomadic lifestyle, or as the act put it, their "naughty, idle and ungodly life and company".

See also
UK immigration law
UK labour law
Vagrancy Act 1824 s 4, contained the offence of telling fortunes

Notes

References
Stanford Lehmberg, The Reformation Parliament 1529-1536 (Cambridge University Press, 1970).

External links

National Archive page with wording of the Act
Text of statute (old script)

Acts of the Parliament of England (1485–1603)
Antiziganism in the United Kingdom
1530 in law
1530 in England
Romani history
Immigration law in the United Kingdom
Discrimination in England
Racism in England
Romani-related controversies
Romani in England